Simapo Island is an island located in the Nandu River, Haikou, Hainan, China. It is currently under development.

The 1.134 km2. island is located approximately 50 metres south of the Qiongzhou Bridge, and 5 km north of the Nandu River Iron Bridge. It will be developed with an emphasis on sports facilities, and will include a sports park and golf course. Garden-style hotels and several bars will also be constructed.

References

External links

 Drawing of planned development

Islands of Hainan